Zouina Bouzebra (born 3 October 1990) is an Algerian hammer thrower.

Early in her career she doubled in the hammer throw and shot put, winning two medals at the 2009 African Junior Championships and achieving a seventh and sixth place at the 2010 African Championships.

Specializing in the hammer throw she finished sixth at the 2012 African Championships, fifth at the 2014 African Championships, fourth at the 2015 African Games and fifth at the 2016 African Championships. She has also won several medals at the Arab Athletics Championships, lastly a gold medal in 2017.

Her personal best throw is 65.20 metres, achieved in June 2021 in Radès This is the Algerian record.

References

1990 births
Living people
Algerian hammer throwers
Algerian female shot putters
Athletes (track and field) at the 2015 African Games
African Games competitors for Algeria
Athletes (track and field) at the 2019 African Games
Athletes (track and field) at the 2022 Mediterranean Games
Mediterranean Games competitors for Algeria
20th-century Algerian women
21st-century Algerian women
Mediterranean Games bronze medalists for Algeria
Mediterranean Games medalists in athletics
Islamic Solidarity Games medalists in athletics